Tour of Kosovo is an annual men's multiple stage bicycle race held annually in Kosovo. Since 2019, it has been on the UCI Europe Tour, classified as a 2.2 event.

Winners

References

External links
 ProCyclingStats

Cycle races in Kosovo
Recurring sporting events established in 2019
Annual sporting events in Kosovo
July sporting events
UCI Europe Tour races